Aigne is a commune in the Hérault department in the Occitanie region of southern France.

The inhabitants of the commune are known as Aignois or Aignoises.

Geography
Aigne is located some 25 km north-west of Narbonne and 40 km north-east of Carcassonne. The commune can be accessed by the D910 road from Beaufort in the south-west continuing through the commune and the village to Aigues-Vives in the north-east. The D177 minor road also comes from Azillanet in the west to the village then continues north to join the D907 at the northern border of the commune. The south-eastern border of the commune is also the border between the Herault and Aude departments. Most of the commune is undulating farmland with large areas of forest especially towards the west.

Numerous streams rise in the commune and flow towards the south-west. The Ruisseau d'Embusque forms a large part of the south-eastern border.

History
A Neolithic presence has been found in Mouchas,  Mouleyres and Embusco.
Large Roman Villas have been found at: Saint-Michel, La Prade, Les Mouleyres, Sainte-Leocadie, and Les Clauses
Slate Tombs have been found at: Saints-Abdon-et-Sennen, La Prade, Sainte-Leocadie, Le Caïrou, Sainte-Luchaire, and Les Mouleyres.

The Treil of Pardailhan were the last noble Aigne family: they were also Barons of Pardailhan and Lords of La Caunette.

Heraldry

Administration

List of successive mayors of Aigne

Population

Economy
Aigne has a cooperative winery located at the entrance of the village. This winery has been absorbed by the cellar of Azillanet and no longer makes wine.

Culture and heritage

Civil heritage
L'Escargot (The Snail) is a unique architectural building dating from the 11th century. This is a spiral of houses centred on the church square which is only accessible by a private porch. It was once flanked by a drawbridge and defended by a portcullis. It is likely that this architecture was the result of a strategic choice of defense.

Religious heritage
The Church contains two items which are registered as historical objects:
An Altar and Tabernacle (18th century)
A Bronze bell (1616)

Tourism
There are several sites to visit with a restaurant on the town square and craft workshops.

See also
Communes of the Hérault department
Arrondissements of the Hérault department
Castles in Hérault

References

External links

Aigne on the old IGN website 
Aigne on the Official website of Pays Haut Languedoc et Vignobles 
The Cooperative winery 
Aigne on Géoportail, National Geographic Institute (IGN) website 
Aigne on the 1750 Cassini Map

Communes of Hérault